Patrik Husak (born April 23, 1990) is a Czech professional ice hockey defenceman currently playing for HC RT Torax Poruba of the Czech 1. Liga.

He played with HC Sparta Praha in the Czech Extraliga during the 2010–11 Czech Extraliga season.

Career statistics

References

External links

1990 births
HC Berounští Medvědi players
Czech ice hockey defencemen
HK Dukla Trenčín players
LHK Jestřábi Prostějov players
HC Nové Zámky players
HC Oceláři Třinec players
HC Slovan Ústečtí Lvi players
HC Sparta Praha players
Living people
People from Kralupy nad Vltavou
Sportspeople from the Central Bohemian Region
Czech expatriate ice hockey players in Slovakia
Czech expatriate sportspeople in Poland
Expatriate ice hockey players in Poland